The St. Louis Cardinals 1999 season was the team's 118th season in St. Louis, Missouri and the 108th season in the National League.  The Cardinals went 75-86 during the season and finished 4th in the National League Central division, 21½ games behind the Houston Astros.

Offseason
November 19, 1998: Eric Davis was signed as a free agent with the St. Louis Cardinals.
November 19, 1998: Ricky Bottalico was traded by the Philadelphia Phillies with Garrett Stephenson to the St. Louis Cardinals for Jeff Brantley, Ron Gant, and Cliff Politte.
December 7, 1998: Willie McGee was signed as a free agent with the St. Louis Cardinals.
December 14, 1998: Édgar Rentería was traded by the Florida Marlins to the St. Louis Cardinals for Armando Almanza, Braden Looper, and Pablo Ozuna.
January 15, 1999: Mike Mohler was signed as a free agent with the St. Louis Cardinals.

Regular season

On April 23, 1999, Fernando Tatís hit two grand slams in the third inning, both off Chan Ho Park.
In 1999, Mark McGwire drove in a league-leading 147 runs while only having 145 hits, the highest RBI-per-hit tally in baseball history.

Season standings

Record vs. opponents

Transactions
May 15, 1999: Heathcliff Slocumb was signed as a free agent with the St. Louis Cardinals.
June 2, 1999: Albert Pujols was drafted by the St. Louis Cardinals in the 13th round of the 1999 amateur draft. Player signed August 17, 1999.

Roster

Player stats

Batting

Starters by position 
Note: Pos = Position; G = Games played; AB = At bats; H = Hits; Avg. = Batting average; HR = Home runs; RBI = Runs batted in

Other batters 
Note: G = Games played; AB = At bats; H = Hits; Avg. = Batting average; HR = Home runs; RBI = Runs batted in

Pitching

Starting pitchers 
Note: G = Games pitched; IP = Innings pitched; W = Wins; L = Losses; ERA = Earned run average; SO = Strikeouts

Other pitchers 
Note: G = Games pitched; IP = Innings pitched; W = Wins; L = Losses; ERA = Earned run average; SO = Strikeouts

Relief pitchers 
Note: G = Games pitched; W = Wins; L = Losses; SV = Saves; ERA = Earned run average; SO = Strikeouts

Awards and records
Mark McGwire, Major League record: First player to hit at least 50 home runs in four consecutive seasons

Farm system

References

External links
1999 St. Louis Cardinals at Baseball Reference
1999 St. Louis Cardinals team page at www.baseball-almanac.com

St. Louis Cardinals seasons
1999 in sports in Missouri